The following is a timeline of the history of London, the capital of England and the United Kingdom.

Prehistory
 120000 BCE – Elephants and hippopotami are roaming on the site of Trafalgar Square.
 6000 BCE – Hunter-gatherers are on the site of Heathrow Terminal 5.
 4000 BCE – Mesolithic timber structure exists on the River Thames foreshore, south of the site of Vauxhall Bridge.
 3800 BCE – Stanwell Cursus is constructed.
 2300–1500 BCE – Possible community on Chiswick Eyot in the Thames.
 1500 BCE – A Bronze Age bridge exists from the foreshore north of Vauxhall Bridge. This bridge either crosses the Thames, or goes to a subsequently lost island in the river.
 300–1 BCE – An Iron Age oppidum in Woolwich, which is possibly London's first port, in the late-Roman period reused as a fort.

Early history to the 10th century

 43 CE – Original Roman settlement of Londinium.
 50 – The original London bridge is constructed out of wood.
 50 onward – Grim's Ditch (Harrow) is dug.
 57 – 8 January: The earliest known handwritten document in the UK is created in London, a financial record in one of the Roman 'Bloomberg tablets' found during 2010–13 on the site of Londinium. Another dated to 65/70-80 CE gives the earliest known written record of the name of Londinium.
 60 or 61 – Londinium is sacked by forces of Boudica.
 122 – Construction of a forum in Londinium is completed; Emperor Hadrian visits. There is a major fire in the city at about this time.
 c. 190–225 – The London Wall is constructed.
 c. 214 – London becomes the capital of the province of Britannia Inferior.
 c. 240 – The London Mithraeum is built.
 c. 250 – Coasting barge "Blackfriars I" sinks in the Thames at Blackfriars.
 255 – Work begins on a riverside wall in London.
 296 – Constantius Chlorus occupies Londinium, saving it from attack by mercenary Franks.
 368 – The city is known as Augusta by this date, indicating that it is a Roman provincial capital.
 490 – Saxons are in power, and the Roman city is largely abandoned.
 By early 7th century – Settlement at Lundenwic (modern-day Aldwych).
 c. 604 – Mellitus is the first Bishop of London in the modern succession to be consecrated.
 650 – A market is active.
 675
 An early fire of London destroys the wooden Anglo-Saxon cathedral, which is rebuilt in stone over the following decade.
 The Church of All Hallows-by-the-Tower is founded in the City by Barking Abbey.
 By 757 – London has come under the control of Æthelbald of Mercia and passes to Offa, who has a mint here.
 798 – An early fire of London takes place.
 838 – Kingston upon Thames is first mentioned.
 842 – London is raided by Vikings with "great slaughter"; they besiege it in 851.
 871 – Autumn: Danes take up winter quarters in Mercian London.
 886
 King Alfred the Great restores London to Mercia.
 The London Mint is established.
 893 – Spring: Edward, son of Alfred the Great, forces invading Danish Vikings to take refuge on Thorney Island.
 911 – Edward the Elder, King of Wessex, transfers London from Mercia to Wessex.
 918 – Ælfthryth, Countess of Flanders and daughter of King Alfred, donates Kentish lands, including Lewisham, Greenwich and Woolwich, to St. Peter's Abbey in Ghent.
 925 – 4 September: Coronation of Æthelstan as King of Wessex at Kingston upon Thames.
 978 – The coronation of Æthelred as King of the English takes place in Kingston upon Thames.
 982 – An early fire of London takes place.
 989 – An early fire of London burns from Aldgate to Ludgate.

The 11th to 15th centuries

 1009 – In August, the Vikings attack London.
 1014?
 Olaf II Haraldsson of Norway perhaps attacks London and burns the wooden London Bridge in support of Æthelred.
 The origin of Borough Market is claimed.
 1016 – In May, Battle of Brentford: King Edmund Ironside defeats Cnut the Great, who then besieges London.
 1066
 25 December: William the Conqueror is crowned as the King of England in Westminster Abbey.
 The Tower of London is chartered.
 Around 1078 – The construction of the White Tower (Tower of London) begins, and it is probably largely completed by 1088.
 1087 – An early fire of London destroys much of the city, including the St Paul's Cathedral. 
 1091 – 23 October: The London tornado of 1091 destroys the wooden London Bridge and severely damages the church of St Mary-le-Bow and other buildings.
 1099 – Westminster Hall is built.
 1100
 5 August: The coronation of Henry I takes place at Westminster Abbey by Maurice (bishop of London).
 15 August: Ranulf Flambard, Bishop of Durham, becomes the first person imprisoned in the Tower of London, by the new king for supposed embezzlement. On 3 February 1101, he becomes the first person to escape from the Tower.
 1106 – Southwark Priory is refounded by the Augustinians.
 1109 – Kingston upon Thames is first chartered.
 1114 – Merton Priory is established.
 1123 – St Bartholomew's Hospital, St Bartholomew-the-Great priory and Smithfield meat market are established.
 1127 – A royal charter creates the Liberty of the Clink in the Borough of Southwark.
 1133 – A royal charter establishes the first annual Bartholomew Fair at Smithfield, which is later to become England's largest cloth fair.
 1135 – 26 May (Pentecost): An The Great Fire of 1135 destroys the wooden London Bridge and seriously damages the St Paul's Cathedral.
 1141 – July: The Anarchy: Matilda I of Boulogne, wife of the imprisoned King Stephen, recaptures London.
 By 1144 – Winchester Palace is completed in Southwark.
 1147 – The Royal Hospital and Collegiate Church of St Katharine by the Tower is founded by Queen Matilda.
 1155 – The Worshipful Company of Weavers, which was established by 1130, is chartered.
 1163 – The new wooden London Bridge is built, with the construction of the first stone-built structure beginning in 1176.
 1180 – The Guild of Pepperers, which is the predecessor of the Worshipful Company of Grocers and the Apothecaries, is founded.
 1185 – 10 February: Temple Church is consecrated.
 1189
 3 September: The coronation of Richard I takes place in Westminster Abbey. Rising against Jews in London.
 Henry Fitz-Ailwin de Londonestone becomes first mayor of London.
 A fair is active.
 1196 – In the Spring, a popular uprising of the poor against the rich is led by William Fitz Osbert, who is hanged after being smoked out of his refuge in the tower of St Mary-le-Bow).
 c. 1200 – The royal treasury is transferred to Westminster from Winchester.
 1205 – The January is exceptionally cold.
 1209 – The rebuilding of the stone London Bridge is completed.
 1210 – Around November, 3 "leopards" (probably lions) are given to Henry III of England by Frederick II, Holy Roman Emperor, making them the first creatures in the menagerie at the Tower of London.
 1212 – 10 July: The Great Fire of 1212 takes place in Southwark and in houses on London Bridge, with fatalities, and so thatched roofs are prohibited in the City as a consequence.
 1215 – 17 May: Rebellious barons occupy London.
 1216 – 21 May: During the First Barons' War, Louis, Count of Artois invades England in support of the barons, landing in Thanet. He enters London without opposition and is proclaimed, but not crowned, King of England at the St Paul's Cathedral.
 c. 1219 – The first, timber Kingston Bridge is completed.
 1222 – 15 July: Rioting after London defeats Westminster in an annual wrestling contest, and the ring-leaders hanged or mutilated in punishment.
 1234 – 2 December: A royal decree prohibits institutes of legal education within the City.
 1235 – Famine in England; 20,000 people die in London.
 1236 – Many people are killed in floods in Woolwich.
 1237 – The Office of Chamberlain of London and status of Freedom of the City of London are both first recorded.
 1240 – The Old St Paul's Cathedral is consecrated.
 1241 – The White Friars' monastery is founded.
 1245 – Savoy Palace is built. In 1246, the Liberty of the Savoy is created.
 1247
 Bethlem Royal Hospital is founded as the Priory of the New Order of St Mary of Bethlem. 
 Romford Market is chartered as a sheep market.
 1249 – The Crutched Friars settle in London.
 1253 – The Austin Friars monastery is founded.
 1255 – An elephant joins the royal menageries at the Tower of London.
 1257
 Around September, the 1257 Samalas eruption takes place, where the volcano erupts on Lombok Island in Indonesia, and the resultant climatic changes combine with a second successive poor grain harvest this summer in Britain to produce famine. This kills an estimated 17,000 people in Britain, of which 15,000 deaths are in London).
 The Brothers of Penitence (Fratres Saccati, 'Brothers of the Sack') first settle in England, in London.
 1262 – The first church of St Mary Abbots in Kensington is founded.
 1263 – 16 July: Rebels occupy London.
 1264 – Around April, the Targeting of Jews during the conflict with the Barons takes place, where one of Simon de Montfort's followers, John Fitz John, leads a massacre of Jews in London.
 1265 – Covent Garden market is established.
 1267 – 9 April: During the Second Barons' War, Gilbert de Clare, 6th Earl of Hertford occupies London. Simon de Montfort's supporters kill 500 Jews.
 1271 – The tower of St Mary-le-Bow collapses.
 1272 – The Worshipful Company of Cordwainers and Worshipful Company of Curriers are granted rights to regulate the leather trade in the City, and the Fishmongers Company is chartered.
 1282 – The Stocks Market is established.
 By 1290 – St Etheldreda's Church is built, and after 1878, it will be the oldest Roman Catholic church building in London.
 1291–4 – Eleanor crosses erected across England to mark the route of the funeral procession at the end of 1290 of Edward I's Queen, Eleanor of Castile, to Westminster Abbey. In London they are erected at Westcheap and Charing Cross.
 1295 – The UK Parliament constituency of Southwark is established.
 1296 – Edward I brings the Stone of Scone from Scotland to Westminster Abbey, and it will be returned in 1996.
 1298 – The UK Parliament constituency of the City of London is established.
 1299 – A fire damages the Palace of Westminster.
 1303 – Enfield Town market is chartered.
 1304 – The Recorder of London is appointed.
 1305 – 23 August: The Scottish rebel William Wallace is hanged, drawn and quartered at Smithfield following a trial for treason in Westminster Hall.
 1307 – The Tabard inn is established in Southwark.
 1308 – The Woolwich Ferry is first mentioned.
 1309 – The Thames freezes.
 1314
 The Old St Paul's Cathedral is completed.
 The Mayor prohibits the playing football in the environs of London.
 1320 – Hanseatic League merchants establish the Steelyard, a Kontor, in Dowgate.
 1322 – The Armourers' Guild is instituted.
 1326 – 15 October: Walter de Stapledon, Bishop of Exeter and Lord High Treasurer, is murdered by the London mob.
 1327 – The Goldsmiths' Company, the Merchant Taylors' Company and the Skinners' Company are incorporated.
 c. 1329 – Marshalsea prison is in operation in Southwark.
 1331 – The Butchers' Guild is granted the right to regulate the meat trade in the City.
 1344 – Clifford's Inn us founded.
 c. 1345 – Durham House is built in Westminster.
 1348 – September–May 1349: The outbreak of the Black Death is at its peak.
 1354 – The title of Lord Mayor of London is first granted.
 1361 – The Company of Drapers is founded (it is chartered in 1364).
 1363
 15 July: The Company of Vintners is chartered.
 The  curfew bell being sounded at St Mary-le-Bow is first recorded.
 1365 – The Company of Plumbers is granted the right to regulate plumbers.
 1366 – The Jewel Tower of the Palace of Westminster is completed.
 1368 – The Company of Poulters is granted the right to regulate the sale of poultry and small game.
 1371 – The London Charterhouse is established.
 1377
 20 February: There are riots in London after John of Gaunt attacks the privileges of the City.
 The Royal Mews is based at Charing Cross.
 1378 – Staple Inn becomes one of the Inns of Chancery.
 1380 – Sir William Walworth, a member of the Fishmongers Guild, becomes Lord Mayor of London for the second time.
 1381 – The Peasants' Revolt takes place:
 12 June: Rebels from Kent and Essex, led by Wat Tyler and Jack Straw, meet in Blackheath, where they are encouraged by a sermon from renegade Lollard priest John Ball.
 14 June: Rebels destroy John of Gaunt's Savoy Palace and Winchester Palace and storm the Tower of London, finding and beheading Simon Sudbury, and also Robert Hales, Lord High Treasurer. King Richard II (age 14) meets the leaders of the revolt and agrees to reforms such as fair rents and the abolition of serfdom.
 15 June: Peasants' Revolt: During further negotiations, Wat Tyler is stabbed to death by William Walworth, Lord Mayor of London in the King's entourage. Noble forces subsequently overpower the rebel army, the rebel leaders are captured, and executed and Richard revokes his concessions.
 1382 – 21 May: Shocks from an earthquake in Canterbury are felt as an 'Earthquake Synod', which is held in London.
 1388 – The Inner and Middle Temples are recorded as corporate bodies.
 1392 – King Richard II retakes control of London.
 1394 – The Mercers Company is incorporated, and the Salters Company is incorporated as the Guild of Corpus Christi.
 1395 – The Worshipful Company of Saddlers is incorporated.
 1397 – 6 June: Richard Whittington is nominated as mayor for the first of four terms. He arranges for the City to buy back its liberties from the Crown.
 1400 – During Lent, children give battle in London.
 1403 – The Stationers' Company is formed.
 1407
 The Company of Merchant Adventurers of London is chartered.
 There is Plague in London.
 1414 – 9 January: A Lollard rebellion in London is suppressed.
 1415
 Syon Monastery is founded.
 This is the approximate date that Moorgate is rebuilt.
 1416
 The Guildhall is rebuilt.
 The Worshipful Company of Ironmongers is chartered.
 1421 – Around 1 May: Whittington's Longhouse, which is a gender-segregated public toilet, opens in Cheapside.
 1422 – Lincoln's Inn is recorded as a corporate body.
 1425 – 30 October: Henry Beaufort, Lord Chancellor, tries to occupy London.
 1427 – Harmondsworth Great Barn is completed.
 1428 – The Company of Grocers is granted a royal charter and completes its hall.
 1430 – A tavern established in High Holborn, which in modern times becomes Henneky's Long Bar and the Cittie of Yorke.
 1433 – Greenwich Park is enclosed by Humphrey, Duke of Gloucester.
 1434
 The "Hopping Hall" tavern recorded in Whitehall, which in modern times becomes the Red Lion.
 23 November: The Thames freezes downstream of London Bridge.
 1437 – The Worshipful Company of Vintners is incorporated.
 1442 – The City of London School is established.
 1444 – 24 April: There is a serious fire at the Old St Paul's Cathedral.
 1448 – The Haberdashers Company is chartered.
 1450
 July: The war tax rebellion is suppressed with ferocity.
 September: Richard Plantagenet, 3rd Duke of York marches an army to London and attacks alleged traitors in the royal government.
 1452 – A Lord Mayor's barge is first recorded.
 1455 – 22 May: The Battle of St Albans takes place near London.
 1460
 26 June: During the Wars of the Roses, Richard Neville, Earl of Warwick and Edward, Earl of March (eldest son of Richard Plantagenet, Duke of York) land at Sandwich with an army and march on London. Here, the Earl of Salisbury remains and, with the support of the citizens, besieges the Tower of London whose Lancastrian commander, Lord Scales, on 4 July turns its weapons against the city.
 19 July: Lord Scales surrenders the Tower of London to the Yorkists, and is subsequently murdered by a mob.
 1461 – The Barbers Company is incorporated.
 1462 – The Tallow Chandlers Company is incorporated.
 1463 – The Ironmongers Company is incorporated as the Ferrers.
 1466 – Crosby Hall is built in Bishopsgate by the wool merchant John Crosby (died 1476).
 1468 – 29 July: Hansa merchants are expelled from London as the Anglo-Hanseatic War breaks out with the Hanseatic League.
 1471
 The Wars of the Roses takes place:
 14 April: At the Battle of Barnet, Edward IV defeats the Lancastrian army under Richard Neville, 16th Earl of Warwick, who is killed.
 May: The Lancastrian commander Thomas Neville is prevented from entering the City but burns Southwark.
 The Dyers Company is incorporated.
 1473 –  St Anthony's Chapel and Lazar House, which is the first medical facility on the Whittington Hospital site in Upper Holloway, is built for those with leprosy.
 1474 – The Pewterers Company is incorporated.
 1475 – The construction of the new hall of Eltham Palace begins.
 1476 – September/December: William Caxton sets up the first printing press in England, in Westminster, where he produces his first full-length book on 18 November 1477.
 1477 – The Carpenters Company is chartered.
 1478 – The Canterbury Tales is published by William Caxton in Westminster.
 1480 – The Fullers' Company, which is a predecessor of the Worshipful Company of Clothworkers, is chartered.
 1481 – A Royal charter is given to Kingston upon Thames, granting it borough status.
 1484
 2 March: A royal charter is granted to the College of Arms, which is the official English heraldic authority.
 10 April: An award by Sir Robert Billesdon, Lord Mayor of London, decides the order of precedence of the City livery companies, resolving a dispute between the Merchant Taylors and the Skinners by a compromise.
 1485
 The Yeoman Warders of His Majesty's Royal Palace and Fortress the Tower of London id formed by the new king Henry VII.
 This is the approximate date that Bromley Hall, which is the oldest surviving brick building in London, is built.
 1486
 The Bakers' Company is chartered.
 The rebuilding of church of St Margaret's, Westminster begins.
 1497 – 17 June: Cornish rebels under Michael An Gof are soundly defeated by Henry VII at the Battle of Deptford Bridge.

16th century

 1500 – Wynkyn de Worde moves his print shop from Westminster to join others in Fleet Street.
 1501
 March: The first royal court is held at the new Richmond Palace.
 The Plaisterers Company is incorporated.
 1503 – 24 January: The construction of Henry VII's Chapel at Westminster Abbey begins.
 1504 – St. John's Gate is built.
 1508 – The Shearmens' Company, a predecessor of the Worshipful Company of Clothworkers, is chartered.
 1509
 11 June: Henry VIII marries Catherine of Aragon privately in the church of the Observant Friars in Greenwich.
 24 June: Henry VIII is crowned as King of England at Westminster Abbey.
 St Paul's School, London, is founded by John Colet, Dean of St. Paul's.
 1512
 Savoy Hospital opens.
 Woolwich Dockyard is established for the Royal Navy.
 1513 – Deptford Dockyard is established for the Royal Navy.
 1514
 20 May: Trinity House is established as a guild of mariners in Deptford to regulate pilotage.
 13 June: Henry Grace à Dieu is built at the new Woolwich Dockyard and is dedicated in Erith. At over 1,000 tons, she is the largest warship in the world at the time.
 15 September: Thomas Wolsey is appointed as Archbishop of York and begins to build York House.
 Thomas Wolsey leases Hampton Court Palace. In 1515, he becomes a Cardinal and begins to rebuild it lavishly.
 1517 – 1 May: The Evil May Day unrest occurs at St Paul's Cross.
 1523 – The rebuilding of the church of St Margaret's, Westminster is completed.
 1527 – Sir George Monoux College, Walthamstow, is founded as a grammar school by Sir George Monoux, draper and Lord Mayor of London.
 1528
 18 January: The Worshipful Company of Clothworkers is incorporated by royal charter, merging the Fullers' and Shearmens' Companies and taking over the latter's hall.
 Late May: The 4th major outbreak of the sweating sickness appears in London.
 June: Thomas Wolsey gives Hampton Court Palace to King Henry VIII.
 1532
 St Andrew Undershaft church built.
 The erection of "Holbein Gate" across Whitehall is completed.
 Henry VIII purchases the area surrounding the Tyburn (stream), which will become St. James's Park.
 Lawyer William Portman leases farmland north west of the City, which is the basis of the Portman Estate.
 1535
 4 May: The first Carthusian Martyrs of London are killed. From now until 1681, 105 Catholic martyrs will be executed in Tyburn.
 Sutton House is built as Bryck Place in Hackney by Ralph Sadler.
 1536
 19 May: Anne Boleyn is executed at the Tower of London.
 22 December: The Thames freezes.
 St James's Palace is built in Westminster.
 Hyde Park is acquired by Henry VIII from the canons of Westminster Abbey and enclosed as a deer park.
 Bentley Priory is dissolved as part of the dissolution of the Monasteries.
 1537
 25 August: The Honourable Artillery Company is chartered.
 18 May: The London Charterhouse is dissolved as part of the dissolution of the Monasteries and its members martyred.
 The first complete Bible translation into English is printed in England by James Nicholson in Southwark.
 1538 – Merton Priory is dissolved as part of the dissolution of the Monasteries.
 1539 – Syon Monastery is dissolved and its community is exiled as part of the dissolution of the Monasteries, St Thomas' Hospital is closed, and the Convent of Holy Trinity, Minories is surrendered.
 1540
 14 January: Southwark Priory is surrendered to the Crown as part of tissolution of the Monasteries.
 28 July: Thomas Cromwell is executed on order from Henry VIII on charges of treason in public on Tower Hill.
 17 September: Westminster Abbey is granted the status of cathedral as part of the dissolution of the Monasteries, which it retains until 1550.
 1543
 Queen Elizabeth's Hunting Lodge in Epping Forest is completed for Henry VIII.
 Approximate date: Wyngaerde's Panorama of London is engraved.
 1545
 The UK Parliament constituency of Westminster is established.
 St Giles-without-Cripplegate church is rebuilt.
 1547
 28 January: King Henry VIII dies at the Palace of Whitehall. His 9-year-old son and successor Edward VI is brought to Enfield Town, where his half-sister Elizabeth I is living, and they are told the news.
 20 February: The coronation of Edward VI of England takes place in Westminster Abbey.
 Edward Seymour, 1st Duke of Somerset and Lord Protector of England, begins the construction of Somerset House.
 1550 – 24 July: The French Protestant Church of London is established by Royal Charter.
 1551 – St Thomas' Hospital is re-established on its former site in Southwark by the Corporation of London, which is taken as the founding date for St Thomas's Hospital Medical School.
 1552 – The first pupils enter Christ's Hospital school for orphans at Newgate, and it receives its royal charter on 16 June 1553.
 1553 – 19 July: Thomas White, Lord Mayor of London, proclaims Mary as the rightful heir to Edward VI, and on 9 August, she arrives in London.
 1554 – 25 January: Wyatt's rebellion begins, and Kingston Bridge is broken as a precautionary measure. On 9 February, Thomas Wyatt surrenders.
 1555 – 4 February: John Rogers is burned at the stake at Smithfield, London, making him the first Marian Protestant martyr.
 1556
 27 June: 13 Protestant Stratford Martyrs are burned at the stake.
 The City takes over Bridewell Palace as a prison and a hospital for homeless children.
 1557
 May: Benedictine monks are allowed to return to Westminster Abbey, but they will again be expelled in 1559.
 4 May: The Stationers' Company is chartered.
 Hampton School founded by Robert Hammond.
 1558 – 25 May: Enfield Grammar School is founded and incorporating an earlier endowment.
 1559
 15 January: Elizabeth I of England is crowned in Westminster Abbey.
 New Custom House is built.
 The predecessor of the private banking house of Child & Co., which will still exist in the 21st century, is established.
 The Salters Company is incorporated.
 1560 – Westminster School is re-established.
 1561
 1 March: Kingston Grammar School is chartered.
 4 June: The spire of the Old St Paul's Cathedral catches fire and crashes through the nave roof, probably as the result of a lightning strike. The spire is not rebuilt.
 The Merchant Taylor's School is founded in the City of London by Sir Thomas White, Sir Richard Hilles, Emanuel Lucar and Stephen Hales, with Richard Mulcaster as first headmaster.
 1563 – Between June and October, the 1563 London plague outbreak kills over 20,000 people.
 1565
 Thomas Gresham founds the Royal Exchange.
 College of Physicians of London first licensed to carry out human dissection.
 1567 – John Brayne builds the Red Lion theatre just east of the City of London, which is a playhouse for touring productions and the first known to be purpose-built in the British Isles since Roman times. However, there is little evidence that the theatre survives beyond this summer's season.
 1569 – Gray's Inn is recorded as a corporate body.
 1570
 The Whitechapel Bell Foundry is known to be in existence. By the time its 18th-century premises closed in May 2017, it was the oldest manufacturing company in Great Britain.
 The home and library of John Dee at Mortlake begin to serve as an informal prototype English academy for gentlemen with scientific interests.
 1571
 23 January: The Royal Exchange opens.
 28 May: The Corporation of London is authorised to improve the Lee Navigation.
 25 July: The Free Grammar School of Queen Elizabeth of the Parishioners of the Parish of Saint Olave in the County of Surrey is established in Tooley Street.
 The Worshipful Company of Blacksmiths is chartered.
 The first permanent London gallows are erected at Tyburn.
 1572 – 13 February: Harrow School is founded by John Lyon.
 1573 – 24 March: The Queen Elizabeth's Grammar School for Boys is established in Barnet at the petition of Robert Dudley, 1st Earl of Leicester.
 1576 – December: James Burbage opens London's 2nd permanent public playhouse and the first to have a substantial life, The Theatre in Shoreditch.
 1579 – Nonsuch House is built on London Bridge.
 1580
 6 April: The 1580 Dover Straits earthquake causes some damage and the death of 2 children in London.
 1581
 4 April: Francis Drake is knighted by order of Queen Elizabeth I aboard the Golden Hind in Deptford.
 A waterwheel is installed on London Bridge.
 1582 – The country house at Highgate, which is later known as Lauderdale House, is built for Richard Martin (Lord Mayor of London).
 1583 – The Bunch Of Grapes Pub is built on Narrow Street in Limehouse. Referred to by Charles Dickens in Our Mutual Friend as "The Six Jolly Fellowship Porters", it still stands in the 21st century, much rebuilt and renamed The Grapes.
 1585 – This is the claimed date that the Spaniards Inn on the Hampstead and Highgate boundary is established.
 1586
 20–21 September: The execution of the 14 conspirators in the Babington Plot, which was to assassinate Elizabeth I and replace her by Mary, Queen of Scots, takes place. As a result, they are hanged, drawn and quartered in St Giles Field, with the first 7 being disembowelled before death.
 The College of Antiquaries (society) is formed.
 c. 1586–90 - The new building for Enfield Grammar School is constructed.
 1587 – The Rose theatre is built by Philip Henslowe in Southwark.
 1592 – In August, the 1592–1593 London plague outbreak is first observed, and there are at least 19,000 deaths up to December 1593, and so theatres are consequently closed for much of the period.
 1593
 6 April: Henry Barrowe and John Greenwood, who are leaders of the Brownist London Underground Church, are hanged at Tyburn.
 5 May: The "Dutch church libel" takes place, where bills posted in London threatening Protestant refugees from France and the Netherlands allude to Christopher Marlowe's plays. On 30 May, Marlowe is stabbed to death in a dispute over the bill at a lodging house in Deptford.
 1594 – Bevis Bulmer sets up a system at Blackfriars to pump water to London.
 1595 – The Swan (theatre) is built in Southwark.
 1596
 February: James Burbage buys the disused Blackfriars Theatre from Sir William More for £600 but is prevented from reusing it as a public theatre by a November petition by wealthy influential neighbors.
 14 February: The Archbishop John Whitgift begins building his hospital at Croydon.
 1597 – Gresham College is founded in the City.
 1598
 c. May?: The première of William Haughton's Englishmen for My Money, or, A Woman Will Have Her Will takes place, and it is considered to be the first city comedy, probably by the Admiral's Men at The Rose theatre.
 22 September: The playwright Ben Jonson kills actor Gabriel Spenser in a duel at Hoxton and is briefly held in Newgate Prison, but he escapes capital punishment by pleading benefit of clergy.
 28 December: The Theatre is dismantled.
 Stow's Survey of London is published.
 1598–1600 – The Damned Crew is at large.
 1599 – In the Spring/Summer, the Globe Theatre opens in Southwark using building material from The Theatre.

17th century

 1600
 In January, the carpenter Peter Street is contracted to build the Fortune Playhouse just north of the City by theatrical manager Philip Henslowe and his stepson-in-law, the leading actor Edward Alleyn, for the Admiral's Men, who move there from The Rose by the end of the year.
 31 December: The East India Company is granted a Royal Charter.
 1601 – 25 February: Robert Devereux, 2nd Earl of Essex, is executed for treason for his part in a short-lived rebellion in the previous month against the Queen, making him the last person beheaded on Tower Green in the Tower of London, with the sword being wielded by Thomas Derrick.
 1603
 24 March: Elizabeth I dies at Richmond Palace and is succeeded on the throne of England by her cousin James VI of Scotland.
 c. April: Outbreak of bubonic plague epidemic in which between 29,000 and 40,000 people die.
 28 April: The funeral of Elizabeth I takes place in Westminster Abbey.
 7 May: Crowds welcome James's arrival in London for his coronation as king of England in Westminster Abbey on 25 July. He subsequently orders the creation of St. James's Park.
 1604 – 15 March: The Royal Entry of King James into London takes place.
 1605
 5 November: Gunpowder Plot: A plot to blow up the Houses of Parliament and the King is foiled when the Catholic plotter Guy Fawkes is found in a cellar below the Parliament with 36 barrels of gunpowder following an anonymous tip-off. On 30 January 1606, 4 of the conspirators are hanged, drawn and quartered for treason outside St Paul's, and the following day Fawkes and the remainder are executed in the same manner in Old Palace Yard, Westminster.
 The Worshipful Company of Gardeners and the Worshipful Company of Butchers are chartered.
 This is the approximate date that the construction of Northumberland House at Charing Cross for Henry Howard, 1st Earl of Northampton, begins.
 1606 – 19 December: The Susan Constant sets out from the Thames leading the Virginia Company's fleet for the foundation of Jamestown, Virginia.
 1608
 July–December: Plague in London, which recurs in the 2 following years.
 The foundation of the Royal Blackheath Golf Club is claimed.
 1609 – The Lord Mayor's Show is revived.
 1611
 Thomas Sutton founds Charterhouse School on the site of the old Carthusian monastery in Charterhouse Square, Smithfield.
 The Worshipful Company of Plumbers is chartered.
 1612 – Hicks Hall is built.
 1613
 29 September: New River opens to supply London with fresh water.
 The Honourable The Irish Society is incorporated as a consortium of City livery companies to colonise County Londonderry during the Plantation of Ulster.
 1614 – In October, the Hope Theatre opens in Southwark. On 31 October Ben Jonson's Bartholomew Fayre: A Comedy debuts here.
 c. 1615 – Clerkenwell Bridewell (prison) is in operation.
 1616
 The Anchor Brewery is established by James Monger next to the Globe Theatre in Southwark. It will be the world's largest by the early 19th century and brew until the 1970s.
 The engraved Visscher panorama of London is published.
 1616–35 – The Queen's House is built in Greenwich to a design by Inigo Jones.
 1617
 23 August: The first one-way streets are created in alleys near the Thames.
 December: The Worshipful Society of Apothecaries is incorporated.
 Aldersgate is rebuilt.
 The Goldsmiths' Company is barge built.
 This is the approximate date that New Prison is in operation.
 1618 – The Company of Adventurers of London Trading to the Ports of Africa is granted a monopoly on trade from Guinea.
 1619
 In January, the royal Banqueting House, Whitehall is destroyed by fire, and Inigo Jones is commissioned to design a replacement.
 21 June: The College of God's Gift is established by the actor-manager Edward Alleyn at Dulwich, incorporating the school, Dulwich College.
 Greenwich Park is enclosed by a brick wall on the orders of King James I.
 1620 – July: The Mayflower embarks from or near her home port of Rotherhithe with around 65 Pilgrims bound for Cape Cod in North America.
 1621
 Between the Spring and October, the Corante: or, Newes from Italy, Germany, Hungarie, Spaine and France, which is one of the first English language newspapers translated from the Dutch, circulates in London.
 The Hackney coach is first recorded.
 1622
 6 January (probable date): The new Banqueting House, Whitehall, opens with a performance of Ben Jonson's The Masque of Augurs to a design by the building's architect, Inigo Jones.
 23 May: Nathaniel Butter begins publication of Newes from Most Parts of Christendom or Weekley Newes from Italy, Germany, Hungaria, Bohemia, the Palatinate, France and the Low Countries.
 Boston Manor house is built by Mary Goldsmith.
 1623
26 October: "Fatal Vespers": 95 people are killed when an upper floor of the French ambassador's house in Blackfriars collapses under the weight of a congregation attending a Catholic mass.
 November/December: Shakespeares Comedies, Histories, & Tragedies is published by Isaac Jaggard and Edward Blount.
 1624 – The Latymer School and Latymer Upper School are founded by the bequest of Edward Latymer.
 1625
 Around August, Over 40,000 people are killed by the bubonic plague in London, and so the court and Parliament temporarily move to Oxford.
 Queen's Chapel is completed in Westminster.
 1626 – 2 February: The coronation of Charles I of England takes place in Westminster Abbey.
 1629
 May: The Worshipful Company of Spectacle Makers is chartered.
 This is the approximate date that the development of Lincoln's Inn Fields for housing begins.
 1630
 The central square of Covent Garden is laid out, and a market begins to develop there.
 Sion College is chartered as a college, guild of London parochial clergy, almshouse and library under the will of Thomas White, vicar of St Dunstan-in-the-West.
 1631
 31 January: The rebuilt St Katharine Cree church is consecrated by William Laud, Bishop of London.
 20 February: A fire breaks out in Westminster Hall, but it is put out before it can cause serious destruction. 
 7 June: St Paul's, Hammersmith is consecrated as a chapel of ease by Laud.
 December: The Holland's Leguer, which is a notorious brothel in Southwark, but it is ordered closed and besieged for a month before this can be carried out.
 The Worshipful Company of Clockmakers is established.
 Tottenham Grammar School is re-endowed.
 London's population reaches 130,163 residents.
 1632 – Forty Hall, Enfield is completed.
 1633
 13 February: Fire engines are used for the first time in England to control and extinguish a fire that breaks out on London Bridge, but not before 43 houses are destroyed. 
 St Paul's, Covent Garden, which was designed by Inigo Jones in 1631 overlooking his piazza, opens to worship, making it the first wholly new church built in London since the English Reformation.
 1635 – The first General Post Office opens to the public in Bishopsgate.
 1636 – Goldsmith's Hall is rebuilt.
 1636–37 – Plague in London.
 1637 – Hyde Park opens to the public in Westminster.
 1638 – The Distillers is granted a royal charter.
 1640 – 11 December: The Root and Branch petition is presented to Parliament.
 1642
 4 January: Charles I attempts to arrest 5 leading members of the Long Parliament, but they escape. This is the last time any monarch will enter the House of Commons.
 2 September: London theatre closure 1642: Parliament orders closure of London's playhouses, effectively ending the era of English Renaissance theatre.
 12 November: Battle of Brentford (First English Civil War): Royalist victory.
 13 November: Battle of Turnham Green (First English Civil War): Royalist forces withdraw in face of the Parliamentarian army and fail to take London.
 1642–43 – The Lines of Communication are constructed to defend the city.
 1647
 7 August: Oliver Cromwell takes control of the Parliament of England with the New Model Army, an attempt by Presbyterian MPs to raise the City of London having been unsuccessful.
 The original Eleanor Cross at Charing Cross is demolished.
 Wenceslaus Hollar's Long View of London from Bankside is etched in Antwerp.
 1648
 11 September: The Levellers' largest petition, "To The Right Honourable The Commons Of England" (The humble Petition of Thousands well-affected persons inhabiting the City of London, Westminster, the Borough of Sonthwark Hamblets, and places adjacent), is presented to the Long Parliament after amassing signatories including about a third of all Londoners (including women).
 6 December: Pride's Purge: Troops of the New Model Army under the command of Colonel Thomas Pride (and under the orders of General Ireton) arrest or exclude Presbyterian members of the Long Parliament who are not supporters of the Army's Grandees or Independents, creating the Rump Parliament.
 1649
 3 January: An explosion of several barrels of gunpowder in Tower Street, London kills 67 people and destroys 60 houses.
 30 January: Charles I is executed outside the Banqueting House, Whitehall.
 April: Bishopsgate mutiny: Soldiers of the New Model Army refuse to leave London, and some are court martialled and 1 is executed.
 1650 – 29 September: Henry Robinson opens his Office of Addresses and Encounters, which is a short-lived form of employment exchange, in Threadneedle Street.
 1652 – A coffee house is in business near Cornhill, opened by Pasqua Rosée.
 1654 – St Matthias Old Church in Poplar is completed.
 1656
 May: First performance of The Siege of Rhodes, Part I, by Sir William Davenant takes place, making it the first English opera (under the guise of a recitative), in a private theatre at his home, Rutland House, in the City. This also includes the innovative use of painted backdrops and the appearance of England's first professional actress, Mrs. Coleman.
 Winter: Lisle's Tennis Court built in Lincoln's Inn Fields for real tennis.
 1657
 8 January: Miles Sindercombe and his group of disaffected Levellers are betrayed in their attempt to assassinate Oliver Cromwell by blowing up the Palace of Whitehall and arrested.
 4 February: Resettlement of the Jews in England: Oliver Cromwell gives Antonio Fernandez Carvajal the assurance of the right of Jews to remain in England. This year the country's first synagogue (in Creechurch Lane) and Jewish cemetery in modern times open in London.
 England's first chocolate house opens in London, together with the Rainbow Coffee House, the city's second such establishment; while tobacconist and coffee house owner Thomas Garway in Exchange Alley is the first person to introduce tea in England.
 1658
 10 March: New London, Connecticut is named.
 The earliest surviving terrace houses in London is built on Newington Green.
 1660
 1 January: Samuel Pepys begins writing his diary.
 3 February: Colonel George Monck and his regiment arrive in London.
 February: John Rhodes reopens the old Cockpit Theatre, forms a company of young actors and begins to stage plays. His production of Pericles will be the first Shakespearean performance of the Restoration era.
 29 May: Charles II arrives in London and assumes the throne, marking the beginning of the English Restoration. He subsequently orders the remodelling of St. James's Park in the French style.
 13–17 October: 8 regicides of Charles I are hanged, drawn and quartered at Charing Cross.
 28 November: Royal Society founded at Gresham College.
 8 December: The first actress to appear on the professional stage in a non-singing role, as Desdemona in Othello. This is variously considered to be Margaret Hughes, Anne Marshall or Katherine Corey.
 This is the approximate date that Vauxhall Gardens open as the New Spring Gardens.
 1661
 6 January: The Fifth Monarchists unsuccessfully attempt to seize control of London, and George Monck's regiment defeats them.
 30 January: 4 deceased regicides of Charles I suffer posthumous execution at Tyburn; Oliver Cromwell's head, with the others', is raised above the Palace of Westminster Hall where it remains until the 1680s, later becoming a tourist attraction in private hands.
 23 April: The coronation of Charles II of England takes place in Westminster Abbey.
 28 June: Lisle's Tennis Court in Lincoln's Inn Fields opens as a playhouse.
 In September, Pall Mall is laid out as a thoroughfare in Westminster.
 The diarist John Evelyn publishes his pamphlet , making it the earliest discussion of the city's air pollution.
 1662
 9 May: Pepys witnesses a Punch and Judy show in Covent Garden, making it the first on record.
 23 August: An extravagant pageant on the Thames greets the arrival of Charles II and his new queen Catherine of Braganza at the Palace of Whitehall from Hampton Court.
 The Streets, London and Westminster Act 1662 is passed, and the first hackney carriage licences are issued.
 John Graunt publishes information about births and deaths in London in one of the earliest uses of statistics.
 1663
 7 May: Theatre Royal, Drury Lane opens.
 The Olde Wine Shades is built as a merchant's house in Martin Lane.
 Diarist John Evelyn obtains a lease of Sayes Court and begins to lay out the garden there.
 1664
 Francis Child enters the London goldsmith's business which, as the private banking house of Child & Co., which will still exist the 21st century.
 The Russian ambassador to the UK donates the first pelicans to live in St. James's Park.
 Eltham Lodge is completed by Hugh May for Sir John Shaw, 1st Baronet (created 15 April 1665).
 The construction of Burlington House begins.
 1665
 6 March: The Philosophical Transactions of the Royal Society begins publication.
 In March, 15-year-old Nell Gwyn makes her first definitely recorded appearance as an actress on the London stage, having previously been a theatre orange-seller.
 12 April: The first recorded victim of the Great Plague of London dies. On 7 July the King and court leave London to avoid the plague, moving first to Salisbury, then to Oxford from 25 September to 1 February 1666, where in October Parliament convenes. The City begins use of Bunhill Fields as a burial ground for the victims.
 13 June: The Worshipful Company of Poulters is granted a royal charter.
 Thomas Firmin sets up a textile factory to provide work for the unemployed.
 Approximate date: The Grecian Coffee House is established in Wapping.
 1666 – 2–5 September: Great Fire of London: A large fire which breaks out in the City in the house of baker Thomas Farriner on Pudding Lane destroys more than 13,000 buildings, including the Old St Paul's Cathedral, but only 6 people are known to have died.
 1667
 8 February: The first part of the Rebuilding of London Act 1666, following last year's Great Fire of London, goes into effect as royal assent is given to the Fire of London Disputes Act 1666, which establishes the Fire Court. The Court, sitting at Clifford's Inn near Fleet Street, hears cases starting on February 27 and continuing until the end of 1668. The London Building Act enforces fireproof construction in the reconstruction of the City.
 Hedges & Butler is established as wine merchants.
 1668
 23 March (Easter): The Bawdy House Riots of 1668 break out.
 The Carmen's Company is established.
 The Lamb and Flag, Covent Garden is built (although first definitely recorded as a public house – The Cooper's Arms – in 1772).
 1669
 The Quaker goldsmiths John Freame and Thomas Gould form a partnership as bankers in the City, making it origin of Barclays.
 Cosimo III de' Medici, Grand Duke of Tuscany, visits the Tower of London and gives the Yeomen Warders the nickname "Beefeaters".
 1670
 21 January: The French-born gentleman highwayman Claude Duval, who was particularly active in Holloway, is hanged at Tyburn, and he is thought to have been buried in St Paul's, Covent Garden.
 14 August: Quakers William Penn and William Mead preach in Gracechurch Street in the City, in defiance of the recently passed Conventicles Act 1670, and are arrested and tried but on 5 September the jury refuses to convict, leading to Bushel's Case.
 The Second rebuilding act is passed to raise the tax on coal to provide funds for rebuilding of St Paul's Cathedral and other City churches destroyed in the Great Fire.
 Leicester Square is laid out.
 The Apothecaries' Hall and the Brewers Hall are built.
 1671
 9 May: Thomas Blood attempts to steal the Crown Jewels from the Tower of London whilst disguised as a clergyman.
 6 June: The rebuilt Vintners' Company Hall is in use in the City.
 9 November: The Duke of York's Theatre is opened at Dorset Garden by the players of the Duke's Company.
 The Merchant Taylors' Hall is rebuilt.
 The Royal Arsenal is established as a military storage facility in Woolwich after it was previously known as "The Warren".
 1672
 25 January: The Theatre Royal in Bridges Street burns down, forcing the King's Company to relocate to the Lincoln's Inn Fields Theatre while the Theatre Royal is rebuilt in Drury Lane.
 30 December: The First commercial public concert series in Europe begins after it was organised by John Banister in Whitefriars near Fleet Street.
 Ludgate, Moorgate, and Newgate are rebuilt, and the rebuilding of Temple Bar and the church of St Stephen's, Walbrook in the City begin to the designs of Christopher Wren.
 The Worshipful Company of Paviors is granted a royal charter.
 Richard Hoare becomes a partner in the London goldsmith's business which, as private banking house C. Hoare & Co., will survive through to the 21st century.
 The Fulham Pottery is established by John Dwight, making it the earliest certainly known native stoneware manufacturer in England, and it will survive until the second half of the 20th century.
 1673
 22 January: The impostor Mary Carleton is hanged in Newgate Prison for multiple thefts and returning from penal transportation.
 The rebuilding of St Mary-le-Bow church in Cheapside and Temple Bar gate across Fleet Street are completed to designs by Wren.
 The Apothecaries' Garden is laid out in Chelsea.
 This is the approximate date that Berkeley House, which is later known as Devonshire House, is completed in Piccadilly.
 1674
 26 March: Theatre Royal, Drury Lane reopens having been rebuilt after a fire in 1672.
 17 July: 2 skeletons of children are discovered at the White Tower (Tower of London) and believed at this time to be the remains of the Princes in the Tower, and they are subsequently buried in Westminster Abbey.
 The Court house is rebuilt.
 The Worshipful Company of Farriers is chartered.
 1675
 7 May: The York Buildings Company ("The Governor and Company for raising the Thames Water at York Buildings") is established.
 c. 21 June: The reconstruction of St Paul's Cathedral under Sir Christopher Wren begins.
 10 August: Charles II places the foundation stone of the Royal Observatory, Greenwich, designed by Wren.
 c. October: Equestrian statue of Charles I (cast c. 1633 to a design by Hubert Le Sueur) re-erected at Charing Cross.
 19 December: St Bride's Church, which was rebuilt to a design by Wren, reopens.
 December: Charles II issues a "Proclamation for the suppression of Coffee Houses" due to the political activity which is occurring in the newly popular establishments, but it is quickly rescinded.
 The Green Ribbon Club founded and is based in Fleet Street, making it the earliest political club.
 1676
 Early: Thomas Firmin starts a workhouse in Little Britain for the employment of the poor in linen manufacture.
 26 May: A fire in Southwark destroys 625 houses.
 July: Bethlem Hospital for the insane moves to new buildings in Moorfields designed by Robert Hooke, which had begun construction in April 1675.
 Summer: The Royal Greenwich Observatory, which was designed by Sir Christopher Wren, is completed.
 Exeter Exchange is built, Wren's rebuilt St Magnus-the-Martyr church completed, and the first Greek Orthodox church in England is consecrated on Hog Lane.
 The hatters that become James Lock & Co. of St James's is established by Robert Davis.
 1677
 10 October: The Grosvenor Estate in Mayfair comes into the hands of the Grosvenor family when Sir Thomas Grosvenor, 3rd Baronet, marries the heiress Mary Davies.
 Monument to the Great Fire of London, which was designed by Wren and Hooke, is completed.
 The George Inn, Southwark rebuilt.
 The John Roan School is established in Greenwich for poor boys.
 1678 – 17 October: The magistrate Sir Edmund Berry Godfrey is found murdered in Primrose Hill, and Titus Oates claims it as a proof of the fabricated "Popish Plot".
 1679
 17 November: An effigy of the Pope is burned after a large procession through the streets of London.
 27 November: The Duke of Monmouth enters London amid scenes of widespread celebration, having subdued the Scottish Covenanters.
 18 December: Rose Alley ambuscade: The writer John Dryden is set upon by 3 assailants, who are thought to have been instigated by the Earl of Rochester in a literary dispute.
 The new churches of St Edmund, King and Martyr and St Stephen's, Walbrook are completed to designs by Wren.
 Joseph Truman acquires the Black Eagle Brewery in Brick Lane to form Truman's Brewery.
 Approximate date: First bagnio opens in London.
 1680
 February: Rev. Ralph Davenant's will provides for foundation of the Davenant Foundation School for poor boys in Whitechapel.
 27 March: William Dockwra's London Penny Post mail service begins.
 The York Buildings are built.
 Approximate date: Jonathan's Coffee-House is in business.
 1681
 June–July: The City's Court of Common Council orders inscriptions for the Monument to the Great Fire of London and the house in Pudding Lane where the fire started blaming it on Papists.
 1 July: Oliver Plunkett, Roman Catholic Archbishop of Armagh and Primate of All Ireland, who is falsely convicted of treason, is hanged, drawn and quartered at Tyburn, making him the last Catholic martyr to die in England. The Catholic intriguer Edward Fitzharris is also executed on the same day.
 22 December: Charles II issues a warrant for the building of the Royal Hospital Chelsea for wounded and retired soldiers.
 1682
 11 March: Work begins on construction of the Royal Hospital Chelsea to a design by Wren, and it will open to Chelsea pensioners in 1692.
 19 November: A fire in Wapping makes 1,500 people homeless.
 Hungerford Market is built in Westminster.
 1683
 12 December: The River Thames frost fair begins, and it lasts for several months. The Chipperfield's Circus dynasty begins when James Chipperfield introduces performing animals to England at the fair in 1684.
 The Churches of St Benet's, Paul's Wharf and St James Garlickhythe, which were rebuilt to designs by Wren, are completed.
 Richard Sadler opens the first Sadler's Wells Theatre as a "Musick House".
 The Friendly Society of London, which is an early fire insurance company, is in business.
 1684
 10 Downing Street is built in Westminster.
 Clarendon House, which was built between 1664 and 1667, is demolished for the construction of Albemarle Street.
 1685
 23 April: The coronation of the Catholic James II takes place in Westminster Abbey.
 29 September: Edward Hemming establishes the first organised street lighting in London, with oil lamps to be lit outside every 10th house on moonless winter nights.
 18–19 October: Louis XIV of France issues the Edict of Fontainebleau, which revokes the Edict of Nantes and deprives Huguenots of civil rights. Many flee to London where they establish a domestic silk weaving industry in Spitalfields and "French ordinaries" (restaurants) in Soho.
 23 October: Elizabeth Gaunt, burned at the stake at Tyburn for alleged complicity in the Rye House Plot, becomes the last woman executed for political treason in England.
 Kensington Square laid out.
 1686
 January: Montagu House, Bloomsbury is destroyed by fire when barely 6 years old.
 1 May: The annual May Fair opens on a new site at Shepherd Market.
 St Andrew Holborn church, which was rebuilt to a design by Wren, is completed.
 1687
 5 July: Isaac Newton's Philosophiæ Naturalis Principia Mathematica, which is known as the Principia, is published by the Royal Society of London.
 Christ Church Greyfriars (Newgate Street) and the churches of St Lawrence Jewry and St Clement's, Eastcheap, which were all rebuilt to designs by Wren, arecompleted. Sir Isaac Newton writes Principia Mathematica
 1688
 By July, the first definitely known performance of the Henry Purcell opera Dido and Aeneas takes place at Josias Priest's girls' school in Chelsea.
 18 December: Glorious Revolution: William of Orange enters London.
 Old Palace Terrace is built in Richmond.
 Over the next 5 years Lloyd's of London marine insurance market begins to form on the premises of Edward Lloyd (coffeehouse owner).
 1689 - On 13 February, William III and Mary II are proclaimed co-rulers of England in a ceremony at Guildhall, with their coronation taking place in Westminster Abbey on 11 April by the Bishop of London, Henry Compton. In May, work begins on remodelling Hampton Court Palace to the design of Sir Christopher Wren for them together with the Hampton Court Maze. Also this summer, the royal couple purchase Nottingham House and commission Wren to expand it to form Kensington Palace, and William commissions a new royal barge (shallop) for Mary.
 1690
 7 January: The first recorded full peal is rung at St Sepulchre-without-Newgate in the City, marking a new era in change ringing.
 March: London, Quo Warranto Judgment Reversed Act 1689 ("An Act for Reversing the Judgment in a Quo Warranto against the City of London and for Restoreing the City of London to its antient Rights and Privileges") passed by Parliament.
 The Worshipful Company of Haberdashers establishes Aske's Hospital, comprising almshouses and a school at Hoxton, from the bequest of Robert Aske, origin of Haberdashers' Aske's Boys' School and others.
 This is the approximate date that the Great Synagogue of London is built for the Ashkenazi Jews.
 1691 – 9 April: A fire at the Palace of Whitehall destroys its Stone Gallery.
 1693
 27 February: The Ladies' Mercury, which is the first periodical specifically for women, begins publication but lasts only for four weeks.
 The financier Richard Hoare relocates Hoare's Bank (founded 1672) from Cheapside to Fleet Street.
 White's is established as "Mrs. White's Chocolate House" in Mayfair by Francesco Bianco.
 1694
 February: The première of Thomas Southerne's play The Fatal Marriage takes place at the Theatre Royal, Drury Lane.
 27 July: The Bank of England is established by royal charter.
 25 October: Queen Mary II founds the Royal Hospital for Seamen at Greenwich; first section completed 1705.
 The new All Hallows Lombard Street church is completed to a design by Wren.
 This is the approximate date that the development of Seven Dials begins.
 1695
 May: The Flying-Post newspaper begins publication.
 June?: The première of Purcell's opera The Indian Queen takes place.
 Trinity Hospital on the Mile End Road is established as almshouses for "28 decay’d Masters & Commanders of Ships or the Widows of such" by Trinity House.
 Hoxton House is established as a private lunatic asylum.
 "Don Saltero's Coffee Shop" opens in Chelsea.
 1696
 Queenhithe windmill is built.
 The evening newspaper Dawk's News-Letter begins publication.
 1697 – 2 December: St Paul's Cathedral holds its first service after rebuilding to celebrate the Treaty of Ryswick.
 1698
 4 January:  The Palace of Whitehall is destroyed by fire.
 11 January–21 April: Czar Peter I of Russia visits England as part of his Grand Embassy, making a particular study of shipbuilding at Deptford Dockyard.
 In December, the Chalybeate well is given to the poor of Hampstead.
 The widow Bourne sets up the business which becomes Berry Bros. & Rudd, and they will still be operating as wine merchants in the 21st century.
 1699
 10 May: Billingsgate Fish Market is sanctioned as a permanent institution by Act of Parliament.
 The Howland Great Wet Dock opens as the first of what become the Surrey Commercial Docks.

18th century

1700 to 1749 

 c. 1700 – The Kit-Cat Club is established.
 1701
 The Bevis Marks Synagogue is built.
 The illustrated magazine Memoirs for the Curious begins publication.
 1702
 11 March: The first regular English national newspaper, The Daily Courant, is published for the first time in Fleet Street by Elizabeth Mallet; it covers only foreign news.
 23 April: The Coronation of Anne, Queen of Great Britain takes place in Westminster Abbey.
 1703
 26–29 November: The Great Storm of 1703 damages ships in the Pool of London and the roof of Westminster Abbey.
 Buckingham House is built in Westminster.
 1704 – Aaron Hart becomes rabbi of the Great Synagogue of London and de facto the country's first chief rabbi.
 1705
 March: The first of the principal buildings of Greenwich Hospital, the King Charles Court, which was designed by Christopher Wren, is completed.
 9 April: The Queen's Theatre in Haymarket is opened by John Vanbrugh and William Congreve.
 There is recognition of the existence of paid able-bodied watchmen in the City.
 1706 – October:
 Thomas Twining opens Twinings in the Strand as Britain's first known tea house, and it will still be in business into the 21st century.
 The predecessors of food manufacturers Crosse & Blackwell set up business in London.
 1707
 17 December: Major breach of the Thames embankment in Dagenham.
 The London Building Act is passed to prevent use of combustible façade materials in the City; subsequently extended to Westminster.
 Fortnum & Mason is in business in Westminster.
 1708
 26 October: Topping out of the new St Paul's Cathedral.
 The Greene Man public house in the Euston Road established as the Farthing Pie House.
 1709
 12 April: The Tatler magazine begins publication, and on 8 July, The Female Tatler follows.
 19 April: The Worshipful Company of Fan Makers is chartered.
 11 November: Henry Sacheverell preaches an incendiary sermon The Perils of False Brethren at St Paul's Cathedral, which leads to his impeachment by Parliament.
 1710
 1 March: The Sacheverell riots take place.
 The Commission for Building Fifty New Churches is set up by the New Churches in London and Westminster Act 1710.
 The insurance firm Sun Fire Office is set up.
 1710–12: Roehampton House is built.
 1710–28: Church Road, Hampstead is built up.
 1711
 24 February: The première of Handel's Rinaldo takes place at the Queen's Theatre, Haymarket, making it the first Italian opera written for the London stage. 1 March: The Spectator begins publication.
 25 December: The rebuilding of St Paul's Cathedral is declared complete by Parliament.
 Crown Court Church is established in Westminster.
 Marlborough House, which had begun construction in 1709, is completed.
 1711–14 – The Hawkubites gang is at large.
 1712
 Spring: The Mohocks gang is supposedly at large.
 By October: The German composer George Frideric Handel settles in London, where he will remain until his death in 1759.
 The Royal Hospital School is established by charter at the site of Greenwich Hospital.
 1713
 9 April: St Mary's Church, Twickenham is severely damaged after the nave collapses, requiring it to be completely rebuilt.
 The Hanover Square development begins.
 1714
 March: The Scriblerus Club, which is an informal group of literary friends, is formed by Jonathan Swift, Alexander Pope, John Gay, John Arbuthnot (at whose London house they meet), Thomas Parnell, Henry St. John and Robert Harley.
 12 May: St Anne's Church, Kew is consecrated as a chapel of ease by the Bishop of Winchester.
 20 October: The coronation of George I of Great Britain takes place in Westminster Abbey.
 Geffrye Almshouses established by the Worshipful Company of Ironmongers in Kingsland Road.
 1715
 13 January: A major fire originating in an explosion in Thames Street destroys more than 100 houses and severely damages the Custom House, which requires its complete rebuilding, before being contained in Tower Street.
 3 May: A total solar eclipse is the last total eclipse visible in London for almost 900 years.
 1 August: The Watermen first compete in a rowing race on the Thames for the Doggett's Coat and Badge sponsored by the actor-manager Thomas Doggett.
 Allen & Hanburys are established as pharmacists by Silvanus Bevan at Old Plough Court.
 1716
 An accidental explosion at The Foundery in Moorfields kills the owner and 16 workers.
 John Gay publishes the poem Trivia, or the Art of Walking the Streets of London.
 1717
 1 January: Count Carl Gyllenborg, the Swedish ambassador to the UK, is arrested in London over a plot to assist the Pretender James Francis Edward Stuart.
 2 March: The dancer John Weaver performs in the first ballet in Britain, which is shown at the Theatre Royal, Drury Lane, The Loves of Mars and Venus.
 24 June: The Grand Lodge of London and Westminster, the first Freemasonic Grand Lodge (modern-day United Grand Lodge of England), is founded.
 17 July: George Frideric Handel's Water Music is performed on a barge on the Thames for King George I. In August, Handel becomes the house composer at Cannons. 
 September (Autumnal Equinox): The first known Druid revival ceremony is held by John Toland at Primrose Hill to found the Mother Grove, which is later to become the Ancient Order of Druids.
 Thomas Fairchild, a nurseryman at Hoxton in the East End, becomes the first person to produce a successful scientific plant hybrid, Dianthus Caryophyllus barbatus, which is also known as the "Fairchild's Mule".
 The Royal Brass Foundry is established at Woolwich Arsenal in a building designed by Sir John Vanbrugh.
 1719
 February: A Royal Academy of Music is established as a company to perform operas under the direction of Handel.
 Raine's Foundation School is established by Henry Raine in Wapping. It closes on 31 August 2020.
 The Hellfire Club is founded.
 The Hand in Hand Fire & Life Insurance Society is founded.
 1720
 May: The first patient is admitted to the Westminster Public Infirmary, the predecessor of St George's Hospital.
 11 June: The marine insurers Royal Exchange and London Assurance companies are incorporated by the "Bubble Act".
 29 December: Haymarket Theatre opens.
 1721
 The Grosvenor Square development begins in Westminster.
 Thomas Guy founds Guy's Hospital, originally for incurables discharged from St Thomas'.
 1722
 March: Daniel Defoe's A Journal of the Plague Year is published under the initials H.F., purporting to be an eyewitness account of the Great Plague of London in 1665.
 The Bakers Hall is built.
 Traffic on London Bridge is required to keep left.
 1722–23 – Ranger's House, Blackheath is probably constructed.
 1723 – 8 March: The Chelsea Waterworks Company receives a Royal Charter.
 1724
 16 November: The notorious criminal Jack Sheppard is hanged at Tyburn.
 Cannons, a house in Edgware for James Brydges, 1st Duke of Chandos, and Maids of Honour Row, terraced houses on Richmond Green, are completed.
 1725
 2 March: A night watchman finds a severed head by the Thames; it is later recognized to be that of the husband of Catherine Hayes. She and an accomplice are later executed for murder.
 24 May: Jonathan Wild, fraudulent "Thief Taker General", is hanged at Tyburn for actually aiding criminals.
 The church of St George's, Hanover Square is completed.
 A fire in Wapping destroys 70 houses.
 Approximate date: Queen Square is completed in Bloomsbury.
 1726
 20 October: The new church of St Martin-in-the-Fields in Westminster is dedicated.
 Fournier Street is built in Spitalfields, and it is mainly occupied by Huguenot silk weavers.
 The original Academy of Vocal Music is founded.
 1727 – 11 October: The coronation of George II of Great Britain takes place in Westminster Abbey.
 1728
 29 January: The première of Gay's Beggar's Opera takes place at the theatre in Lincoln's Inn Fields.
 Queen Caroline divides Kensington Gardens from Hyde Park.
 1729
 In November, the first (wooden) Putney Bridge as the only fixed crossing of the Thames between London Bridge and Kingston are completed.
 East India House; Christ Church, Spitalfields and St Botolph-without-Bishopsgate church (both designed by Nicholas Hawksmoor); and Marble Hill House, Twickenham are completed, with Chiswick House being designed by the owner, Richard Boyle, 3rd Earl of Burlington and William Kent.
 Dr Williams's Library is opened as a research centre for nonconformist theology.
 1730
 3 February: The Daily Advertiser is founded as the first newspaper funded by advertising.
 The River Westbourne dammed to form The Serpentine in Hyde Park.
 The perfumer Floris of London is established as a barber's.
 1731
 1 January: The Gentleman's Magazine begins publication.
 28 April: A fire at White's Chocolate House, which is near St. James's Palace, destroys the historic club and the paintings therein, but is kept from spreading by the fast response of firemen.
 May: Round Pond completed in Kensington Gardens.
 23 October: A fire at Ashburnham House damages the nationally owned Cotton library, which is being housed here at the time.
 1732
 Prince Frederick's Barge is built.
 7 December: The original Theatre Royal, Covent Garden, which is the modern-day Royal Opera House, is opened by John Rich.
 1732–37 – The first section of River Fleet is culverted.
 1733
 16 October: Devonshire House, which is the former Berkeley House in Piccadilly, is destroyed by a fire.
 St Giles in the Fields church is rebuilt.
 St George's Hospital opens at Hyde Park Corner, which is taken as the founding date of St George's Hospital Medical School.
 1734 – The Bank of England moves to its modern-day location in Threadneedle Street.
 1735
 22 September: Sir Robert Walpole becomes the first Prime Minister to occupy 10 Downing Street as his official residence in his capacity as First Lord of the Treasury.
 The Sublime Society of Beef Steaks is founded.
 William Hogarth produces his A Rake's Progress series of paintings.
 1736
 19 February: The première of Handel's Alexander's Feast takes place at the Theatre Royal, Covent Garden.
 27 July: Riots in east London protesting at Irish immigrants providing cheap labour.
 Parliament passes the Gin Act 1736 in an attempt to curb the Gin Craze.
 1737
 2 March: Samuel Johnson and his former pupil David Garrick leave Lichfield to seek their fortunes in London.
 21 June: The Theatrical Licensing Act is passed, introducing censorship to the London stage, and so plays now require approval before production. The "legitimate drama" is limited to the theatres at Drury Lane, Covent Garden and the Haymarket, and Edward Capell is appointed as the deputy-inspector of plays.
 1738
 24 May: Aldersgate Day: John Wesley experiences a spiritual rebirth at a Moravian Church meeting in Aldersgate, which essentially launches the Methodist movement.
 Marylebone Gardens open.
 1739
 16 January: The first performance of Handel's oratorio Saul takes place at The King's Theatre, Haymarket.
 29 January: The building of Westminster Bridge begins.
 4 April: The first performance of Handel's oratorio Israel in Egypt takes place at The King's Theatre.
 17 October: The Foundling Hospital, which was established by Thomas Coram, is granted its royal charter. On 25 March 1741, the first children are admitted to its temporary premises in Hatton Garden.
 25 December: The Thames freezes.
 The building of Oxford Street begins.
 1740
 23 September: The London Infirmary is established; it opens on 3 November in Moorfields.
 The first Bow Street Magistrates' Court is presided over by Thomas de Veil.
 Thomas Witherby establishes his stationery business in London, specializing in printing and publishing for the marine insurance industry. By the end of the first decade of the 21st century, it will claim to be the oldest independent publisher in the English speaking world as the Witherby Publishing Group.
 This is the approximate date that Devonshire House is completed in Piccadilly and Gin|Booth's]] London dry gin is first produced.
 1741
 13 April: The Royal Military Academy, Woolwich is established to train officers of the Royal Artillery and Royal Engineers.
 19 October: The actor David Garrick has his London stage debut in Richard III.
 St Katherine Coleman church is rebuilt.
 1742
 28 May: The first known British bagnio to offer a swimming pool opens in London.
 16 September: The construction of the Foundling Hospital starts, and the first boys are admitted in 1745.
 The Chelsea Water Works Company introduces a Newcomen atmospheric engine in Pimlico, making it the first economically successful steam pumping engine in London.
 Samuel Whitbread forms a partnership to acquire breweries, which is the foundation of the Whitbread hospitality business.
 Wilton's restaurant begins life as an oyster stall in Haymarket.
 1743
 21 February: The première of Handel's oratorio Samson takes place at the Theatre Royal, Covent Garden.
 The Gin Act 1743 attempts to increase taxation on gin, which provokes riots in London.
 Ranelagh Gardens opens as pleasure grounds in Chelsea.
 c. 1743–45 – The Chelsea porcelain factory is established.
 1744
 The auctioneer Baker, which is later known as Sotheby's, is in business.
 The Baltic Exchange is formed in the City.
 The rebuilding of St Botolph's Aldgate church by George Dance is completed.
 1745
 28 September: The song later to become the British national anthem God Save the King is first performed at the Drury Lane Theatre in a setting by Thomas Arne.
 6 December ("Black Friday"): Jacobite rising: Panic in London over the news that Jacobite forces from Scotland have reached as far south as Derby 2 days previously.
 The eest towers of Westminster Abbey, which had begun construction in 1722, is completed to a design by Nicholas Hawksmoor.
 1746
 30 July: Francis Towneley is convicted of treason before being hanged, drawn and quartered at Kennington Common with fellow members of the Jacobite Manchester Regiment, and the heads of 2 of them become the last to be publicly displayed on Temple Bar.
 The Shepherd Market development is completed.
 The Carmen become a livery company.
 Rocque's Map of London is published.
 1747
 31 January:  The first venereal diseases clinic opens at London Lock Hospital.
 The piers of Westminster Bridge, which are under construction, are found to be sinking.
 1748
 28 March: A fire in the City causes over £1,000,000 worth of damage.
 August: The Camberwell beauty butterfly is named after specimens found in Camberwell.
 Henry Fielding organises the forerunner of the Bow Street Runners, starting off with 8 men.
 The George and Vulture pub is built in the City.
 1749
 27 April: A firework display in Green Park to celebrate the Treaty of Aix-la-Chapelle (1748) finishes early due to the outbreak of fire and rain, but it sees the first official performance of Handel's wind band suite Music for the Royal Fireworks.
 27 May: Handel stages a benefit concert at and for the Foundling Hospital at which the Foundling Hospital Anthem is premiered.

 1750 to 1799 
 1750
 8 February: An earthquake is felt in London.
 8 March: A second, more powerful earthquake is felt in London, making this the last to have an epicentre here.
 1 May: Handel begins the tradition of benefit performances of his oratorio Messiah at and for the Foundling Hospital.
 18 November: The first Westminster Bridge opens, making it the only fixed crossing of the Thames between London Bridge and Putney.
 Berners Street is laid out in Westminster.
 Whitbread acquire a porter brewery on Chiswell Street.
 1751
 The Society of Antiquaries of London is incorporated.
 St Luke's Hospital for Lunatics is founded.
 1752
 Mansion House is completed on the site of Stocks Market.
 The Liberty Bell originally cast at the Whitechapel Bell Foundry for the Pennsylvania State House in Philadelphia.
 1753
 29 January: After a month's absence, Elizabeth Canning returns to her mother's home in London and claims that she was abducted, and the following criminal trial causes uproar.
 7 June: The British Museum is established by Act of Parliament.
 13 December: The first Hampton Court Bridge opens, and it is built of wood in Chinoiserie style.
 The first stage of Horace Walpole's Gothic Revival 'Castle' at Strawberry Hill is completed.
 1755 – 15 April: Samuel Johnson's A Dictionary of the English Language is published by the group of London booksellers, who commissioned it in June 1746, with Johnson and his assistants having worked on the project at his home, 17, Gough Square.
 1756
 25 June: The Marine Society is founded.
 The first section of New Road opens.
 1757
 4 April: The Lord Mayor of London's State Coach is commissioned.
 Harris's List of Covent Garden Ladies, which is the annual directory of prostitutes, is first published.
 Simpson's Tavern, Cornhill is established.
 1758 – 11 April: A temporary wooden bridge over the Thames, which is erected while the centre stone span of London Bridge is under repair, burns down.
 1759
 15 January: The British Museum opens at Montagu House, Bloomsbury.
 4 June: The first Kew Bridge, a wooden toll bridge over the Thames, opens to the public, replacing a ferry.
 August: Holbein Gate is demolished.
 1760
 Hamleys toy shop is in business in High Holborn.
 Berkeley Square is laid out.
 Bishopsgate, Cripplegate, and Ludgate of the London Wall are demolished.
 1761
 8 February: An earthquake breaks chimneys in Limehouse and Poplar.
 8 March: A second earthquake occurs in north London, Hampstead and Highgate.
 22 September: The coronation of George III of Great Britain takes place in Westminster Abbey.
 Buckingham Palace is sold to George III, and the remodelling as a house for his new wife Queen Charlotte begins the following year.
 The Orangery and pagoda in Royal Botanic Gardens, Kew are designed by William Chambers.
 Aldersgate and Aldgate of the London Wall are demolished.
 1762
 1 January: Boodle's is established as a gentlemen's club run by William Almack.
 January: The "Cock Lane ghost" appears.
 23 March: The first legitimately constituted Sandemanian congregation in England meet at Glover's Hall.
 22 May: The Royal family first takes up residence at Buckingham House.
 The last remaining buildings are cleared from London Bridge.
 Moorgate of the London Wall is demolished.
 The German composer Johann Christian Bach arrives in London, where he will spend the remaining 20 years of his life.
 1763
 16 May: James Boswell is introduced to Samuel Johnson at Thomas Davies's bookshop in Covent Garden.
 Bow Street Horse Patrol are established to deal with highway robberies in the London area.
 1764
 February: Joshua Reynolds co-founds The Club (dining club) with Samuel Johnson.
 March: Brooks's is established as a Whig Gentlemen's club.
 23 April: Mozart family grand tour: 8-year-old W. A. Mozart settles in London for a year, Here, he will write his first 3 symphonies.
 December: Benjamin Franklin arrives in London to represent the American colonies following a previous visit in 1757.
 Portman Square is laid out.
 Horse Shoe Brewery is established at St Giles Circus for the production of porter.
 Lloyd's Register of Ships begins publication.
 1765 – February: Almack's Assembly Rooms open in St James's.
 1766
 May: The London Paving and Lighting Act is passed.
 5 December: James Christie holds the first sale at Christie's auction house.
 Tattersalls is founded as a racehorse auction by Richard Tattersall at Hyde Park Corner.
 John Gwynn's proposals London and Westminster Improved is published.
 1767 – Newgate is demolished, leaving Temple Bar as the last remaining City gate.
 1768
 9 January: Philip Astley stages the first modern circus, with acrobats on galloping horses.
 10 May: John Wilkes is imprisoned for writing an article for The North Briton severely criticising King George III. This action provokes protesters to riot, and in Southwark, troops fire on the mob, killing 7, which is the Massacre of St George's Fields.
 10 December: The Royal Academy of Arts is established.
 The publisher John Murray is established.
 The rebuilding of Pitzhanger Manor in Ealing by George Dance for his own use takes place.
 1769
 25 April–27 May: The first Royal Academy summer exhibition is held.
 28 June: The Morning Chronicle newspaper begins publication.
 7 August: Hackney Cut opens.
 September: The Spitalfield Riots by silk weavers attempting to maintain their pay rates culminate in arrests by soldiers and the killing of 2 weavers.
 19 November: The first Blackfriars Bridge opens.
 The work on Syon House to the design of Robert Adam ceases.
 Gordon's London dry gin first produced.
 1770
 August: The Lady's Magazine begins publication.
 17 September: The Limehouse Cut opens.
 The original Coal Exchange opens.
 1771
 In November, the first Battersea Bridge, a wooden toll bridge over the Thames at Chelsea, opens to pedestrians. It opens to vehicles in 1772.
 The intersection St George's Circus is built.
 1772
 2 November: The Morning Post newspaper begins publication.
 The Adelphi Buildings terrace is completed in Westminster by Robert Adam and his brothers.
 1773
 An informal Stock Exchange opens on Threadneedle Street.
 Astley's Amphitheatre is founded on Westminster Bridge Road.
 The original sundial column is removed from Seven Dials and acquired by the architect James Paine.
 1774
 17 April: The first avowedly Unitarian congregation at the Essex Street Chapel is founded by Theophilus Lindsey.
 2 May: The Society of Antiquaries of London open the coffin of King Edward I in Westminster Abbey and discover that his body has been perfectly preserved for 467 years.
 5 October–10 November: 1774 British general election: In Westminster, Ignatius Sancho becomes the first person of African origin eligible to vote in Britain.
 The London Building Act ("Black Act") aims to standardise the quality and construction of buildings.
 The residential development of Highbury Fields begins.
 1775–76 – Winter: An unusually deadly influenza epidemic kills nearly 40,000 people.
 1776
 23 May: The first purpose-built Freemasons' Hall in England opens on Great Queen Street to a design by Thomas Sandby.
 The construction of Somerset House begins in Westminster.
 1777
 12 January: Richmond Bridge opens to traffic and replacing a ferry.
 8 May: The first performance of Richard Brinsley Sheridan's comedy of manners The School for Scandal takes place at the Theatre Royal, Drury Lane.
 24 July: The rebuilt church of St Alphege London Wall opens.
 Hans Place is laid out in Knightsbridge.
 1778
 1 November: Wesley's Chapel opens for worship on the City Road.
 The second wooden Hampton Court Bridge built.
 Joseph Bramah patents an improved form of the flush toilet, which he begins to manufacture.
 Flint & Clark, which is the predecessor of Debenhams, begin trading as drapers; their successor will enter liquidation in 2020.
 1779
 2 January: A devastating fire guts the chapel of Greenwich Hospital.
 Robert Adam completes his remodelling of Kenwood House on Hampstead Heath for William Murray, 1st Earl of Mansfield, which had begun in 1764.
 1780
 2 June: An Anti-Catholic mob led by Lord George Gordon marches on Parliament leads to the outbreak of the Gordon Riots, in which the City banks are attacked.
 7 June: The Gordon Riots are ended by the intervention of troops. About 285 people are shot dead, with another 200 wounded and around 450 arrested, of whom around 25 will be executed.
 The Finsbury Dispensary is founded.
 The Middlesex Sessions House opens on Clerkenwell Green.
 The original Craven Cottage is built by William Craven, 6th Baron Craven.
 1781 – July: Barclay Perkins & Co take over the Anchor Brewery in Southwark from Hester Thrale for the brewing of porter.
 1782
 10 October: Sarah Siddons makes a triumphant return to the Drury Lane Theatre in the title role of Garrick's adaptation of Thomas Southerne's Isabella, or, The Fatal Marriage.
 4 November: The Surrey Theatre opens as the Royal Circus and Equestrian Philharmonic Academy on Blackfriars Road.
 The first Foot Patrol are in London.
 The rebuilt Newgate Prison is completed.
 1783
 Between March and May, the Zong massacre trials are held.
 8 June: The Surrey Chapel, Southwark is established by the evangelical preacher Rowland Hill.
 7 November: The last public execution is held at Tyburn, and from 9 December, executions are held outside the new Newgate Prison.
 1784
 Around April to August, William Roy sets out the baseline of the Anglo-French Survey (1784–1790) on Hounslow Heath.
 2 April: The construction of Severndroog Castle on Shooter's Hill begins.
 21 August: Joseph Bramah patents the Bramah lock which he then begins to manufacture.
 15 September: The Italian Vincenzo Lunardi makes the first hydrogen balloon flight in Britain, from Moorfields to South Mimms.
 The development of Somers Town begins.
 1785
 The London Hospital Medical College opens as England's first chartered medical school.
 The New Spring Gardens is renamed Vauxhall Gardens.
 1787
 31 May: The original Lord's Cricket Ground holds its first cricket match; Marylebone Cricket Club is founded.
 John Courage acquires the Anchor Brewhouse in Shad Thames.
 1788
 1 January: The first edition of The Times newspaper is published under this title after it was launched in 1785 as The Daily Universal Register.
 Admiralty House is built on Whitehall.
 The Revolution Society is formed.
 The group that later becomes the Royal Philanthropic Society is formed to assist homeless children.
 1789
 4 May: The Boydell Shakespeare Gallery opens.
 22 September: The first stone Kew Bridge opens.
 London plane trees (Platanus × acerifolia) are planted in Berkeley Square.
 Rowney, which was established in 1783 as perfumers, enter the artists' supplies business.
 1790 – 23 June: The alleged London Monster arrested, and he later receives 2 years' imprisonment for 3 assaults.
 1791
 1 January: The Austrian composer Joseph Haydn arrives in England at the invitation of London resident impresario Johann Peter Salomon, where his concerts are huge successes. On 11 March, the first of his London symphonies, Symphony No. 96, is premièred  at the Hanover Square Rooms. He visits again in 1794.
 The first St James's, Spanish Place (Roman Catholic) is built as a chapel primarily to serve the Spanish Embassy.
 The Camden Town development begins.
 The Giltspur Street Compter (prison) built.
 The Architect John Soane begins reconstruction of the Bank of England.
 1792
 25 January: The Radical London Corresponding Society is formed.
 21 June: Iolo Morganwg holds the first Gorsedd ceremony, on Primrose Hill.
 29 September: The first St Patrick's Church, Soho Square (Roman Catholic) is consecrated as a chapel primarily to serve the Irish.
 Henry Walton Smith and his wife Anna establish the newsagent's business on Little Grosvenor Street which will become W H Smith.
 1793
 The painter Robert Barker opens his panorama in a purpose-built rotunda off Leicester Square.
 The permanent Cavalry Barracks, Hounslow are established.
 1794
 12 March: The rebuilt Theatre Royal, Drury Lane opens.
 23 July: The Ratcliffe Fire destroys over 400 homes.
 The construction of houses on the edge of Blackheath, which was designed by Michael Searles, begins with The Paragon (a crescent), South Row and Montpelier Row, and they will be completed in 1805.
 Coldbath Fields Prison is rebuilt.
 William Blake publishes Songs of Experience including the poem "London".
 Sarson's vinegar is first brewed in Shoreditch.
 1795
 22 September: The London Missionary Society is established.
 29 October: George III is pelted with stones by an angry mob as the bread riots continue.
 The Pantheon os rebuilt.
 The Ackermann print-shop is in business.
 1796
 1 February: Protests over the price of bread culminate in Queen Charlotte being hit by a stone as she and George III return from a trip to the theatre.
 December: The coldest day in London is recorded, where it reaches −21.1 °C (−6 °F) in Greenwich.
 1797
 15 January: The London haberdasher John Hetherington wears the first top hat in public and attracts a large crowd of onlookers. He is later fined £50 for causing public nuisance.
 Hatchards bookshop is established in Piccadilly by John Hatchard.
 1798
 2 July: The Marine Police Force is formed on the Thames by magistrate Patrick Colquhoun to prevent pilfering in the Port of London and West India Docks; it is the first organised police force in Britain.
 Henry Maudslay sets up the mechanical engineering business that becomes Maudslay, Sons and Field.
 Rules (restaurant) is opened by Thomas Rule in Maiden Lane, Covent Garden as an oyster bar, making it London's oldest restaurant on its original site.
 1799
 Gunter's Tea Shop is in business.
 Horsemonger Lane Gaol completed as the new Surrey County Gaol in Southwark.

19th century

20th century

21st century

See also

 History of London
 List of Lord Mayors of London

References

BibliographySee also lists of works about London by period: Tudor London, Stuart London, 18th century, 19th century, 1900–1939, 1960s''
published in the 19th century
 
 
 
 
 
 
 
 
 
 
  circa 1882
 
 

published in the 20th century
 
 
 
 
 
 
 
 
 
 
 

published in the 21st century

External links

 British History Online. London
 
 
 .
 Europeana. Items related to London, various dates.
 Digital Public Library of America. Items related to London, various dates
 

London
London-related lists

london
London
London